HMAS HDML 1324, also known as Nepean was a 58-ton Harbour Defence Motor Launch of the Royal Australian Navy (RAN). Built by A.McFarlane and Sons, Birkenhead, South Australia and commissioned into the RAN on 12 June 1944. She was at the Timor surrender of the Japanese occupying forces in 1945. She was later reclassified as a Seaward Defence Boat. Parts from HDML 1324 were used to refit SDB 1325.

Citations

References
 

Patrol vessels of the Royal Australian Navy
Ships built in South Australia
1944 ships